Zhang Liang (born 1983-03-01 in Ningxia) is a male Chinese Olympic racing cyclist, who competed for China at the 2008 Summer Olympics.

Sports career
1998 Taole County Sports Commission/Ningxia Regional Cycling Team;
2003-2004 National Cycling Team;
2006/2007 National Team for Intensified Training

Major performances
2000 Asian Junior Championships - 3rd track 4km team pursuit;
2003/2007 Road National Champions Tournament - 3rd individual 180km road;
2004/2006 Road National Champions Tournament - 2nd individual 180km road

References
 Profile Beijing 2008 Team China

1983 births
Living people
Chinese male cyclists
Cyclists at the 2008 Summer Olympics
Olympic cyclists of China
Cyclists from Ningxia
21st-century Chinese people